Jeremiah Joseph Callahan, C.S.Sp. (January 11, 1878 – October 11, 1969) was a Roman Catholic priest and the fifth president of Duquesne University in Pittsburgh, from 1931 until 1940.

Personal background
Jeremiah Callahan was born in Michigan in 1878. He was a graduate of the Duquesne University Prep School, and of the university itself, though at the time of his graduation in 1897 it was still known as the Pittsburgh Catholic College. After his graduation, he studied for the priesthood at St. Vincent's Seminary in Latrobe, Pennsylvania. His post-graduate work included study at the Holy Ghost Apostolic College (now Holy Ghost Preparatory School) in Cornwall Heights, Pennsylvania, and the Pontifical Gregorian University in Rome. After his ordination in 1904, he taught languages for a year at Duquesne University, was briefly appointed an instructor of philosophy and theology at the Ferndale Holy Ghost Seminary in Norwalk, Connecticut, and then served as the pastor of a church in Chippewa Falls, Wisconsin, for seven years. After that assignment, he was appointed head of the Holy Ghost Apostolic College in 1916, a role he filled for fifteen years.

President of Duquesne University
Callahan formally succeeded Martin Hehir as president of Duquesne University on January 4, 1931. He promptly greeted a throng of newspaper reporters by explaining his personal critique of Einstein's theory of relativity. Inaugural ceremonies were held in Oakland's Soldiers and Sailors Memorial Hall on April 30, 1931. In his inaugural address, he set forth a theory of education that was very different from that of his predecessor. Hehir had taken a college that focused on a classical approach to education, surveyed the needs of the Catholic immigrant community in Pittsburgh, and transformed Duquesne University into a school with an emphasis on occupational training and practicality in curriculum. Callahan, on the other hand, believed that liberal education should "lead to the possession of manners and the mental attitude of a gentleman, the complete and perfectly rounded out man of the world".

Although Callahan was hand-picked for the position by Hehir, Duquesne historian Joseph Rishel calls Callahan "an unfortunate choice". The onset of the Great Depression had a negative impact on the university's fortunes, and Callahan's impersonal and rigid administrative attitude only exacerbated the crisis. Moreover, he was uninterested in day-to-day decision making, instead outsourcing authority to the deans of the individual schools, who operated with virtual autonomy. He habitually took two-month "sabbaticals", even in the middle of the school year, and did not associate with the other Spiritan priests living on campus—he chose instead to live in a private apartment he had constructed adjoining the Administration Building. His inflexible attitude was summed up by one of his confrères in the congregation: "Father Callahan was the one man I knew who never had a doubt".

Conflict and resignation
By 1936, Callahan's "disregard of constitutional safeguards" had resulted in all-time low morale among university staff, and the bishop of Pittsburgh, as well as a number of parents, were rapidly losing confidence in his leadership. Callahan had privately conceded to the demands of Father Christopher J. Plunkett, the American Provincial of the Holy Ghost Fathers, and vowed to resign after returning from his February sabbatical. Indeed, his departure was covered by the Duquesne Duke, amid rumors of "shakeups in the administration". Two weeks into Callahan's absence, Father H. J. Goebel, the university's vice-president and treasurer, resigned. W. S. York Critchley, a man whom Callahan had appointed to be dean of the School of Education, followed suit, as it had been revealed that his academic credentials were forged.

In light of these scandals, Callahan announced his resignation when he arrived back in Pittsburgh in May 1936. He then promptly changed his mind. Plunkett responded by firing him from the office of president, but Callahan ignored the order and simply remained in office, claiming that only the board of directors had the authority to remove him. A meeting of the board in June failed to oust Callahan with a vote by secret ballot, and so Callahan hung on to the office for another four years.

Callahan's term came to an end when Plunkett died in 1939. Father George J. Collins was appointed American provincial, and transferred Callahan to St. Augustine's, a poor rural African-American parish located 10 miles outside of Natchitoches, Louisiana on the Cane River. Callahan resigned at last in February 1940, in order to "bring this internal dissatisfaction to an end". He remained at St. Augustine until his death in 1969, becoming a well-known figure in Central Louisiana.

During Callahan's ten-year term as president, the university's curriculum grew to include day sessions in the School of Liberal Arts and Sciences, as well as in pharmacy, accounting, pre-medical and pre-dental studies, oratory, and music and drama. The university took over supervision of Mount Mercy College for Women (today Carlow University), and athletic programs were expanded. (When asked if he wasn't overemphasizing athletics, Callahan responded, "The Greeks of Homer's time trained more rigorously than football players of today".)

His successor was Father Raymond V. Kirk.

Mathematical Work 
Callahan was an academic who studied Euclidean geometry. The first volume of his book Euclid or Einstein? A Proof of the Parallel Theory and a Critique of Metageometry claimed to have proved Euclid's fifth "parallel" postulate, by re-ordering the logical structure of Euclid's Elements. Callahan proved that for any point not on a given line, there exists a parallel line in the plane so determined and through the point that does not intersect the given line. Euclidean geometry requires the existence of a unique parallel line satisfying the specified conditions--which Callahan did not prove. The second volume purported to refute the theory of relativity.

Life after Duquesne
Callahan served as a pastor in Louisiana until the late 1950s. He died on October 11, 1969 at the age of 91, and is buried in Sacred Heart Cemetery in Morrilton, Arkansas.

Notes and references
Notes

References

Works cited

External links
A brief history of Duquesne University
Science: Angle Trisected? 1931 article from Time magazine detailing some of Callahan's objections to Einstein's theory
Rev Jeremiah Joseph Callahan at Find a Grave

Presidents of Duquesne University
1878 births
1969 deaths
20th-century American mathematicians
American Roman Catholic priests
Holy Ghost Fathers
Mathematicians from Michigan
Mathematicians from Louisiana